Brian Stuart Smith (born December 6, 1937) is a Canadian former professional ice hockey player who played 61 games in the National Hockey League with the Detroit Red Wings between 1958 and 1960. The rest of his career, which lasted from 1958 to 1969, was spent in the minor leagues. He is the son of former NHL hockey player, Stuart Ernest Smith.

Career statistics

Regular season and playoffs

References

External links
 

1937 births
Living people
Buffalo Bisons (AHL) players
Canadian ice hockey left wingers
Detroit Red Wings players
Edmonton Flyers (WHL) players
Hamilton Tiger Cubs players
Hershey Bears players
Ice hockey people from Ontario
Jacksonville Rockets players
Los Angeles Blades (WHL) players
Phoenix Roadrunners (WHL) players
Sportspeople from Greater Sudbury